James Chesson (born September 14, 1980) is an American racing driver from Far Hills, New Jersey. He is the younger brother of former IndyCar Series driver P. J. Chesson.

A sprint car driver who had made a number of appearances in the World of Outlaws series, James joined his older brother mid-season driving in the Indy Pro Series for three races in 2004 with James driving for veteran open wheel owner Mo Nunn. He was able to win in his second start in a race at California Speedway. Making only three starts he was able to finish 14th in the 2004 championship. He returned in 2006 to drive in the Freedom 100 but was knocked out by suspension trouble.

External links
Indy Lights/Indy Pro Series results on Champ Car Stats

1980 births
Living people
Indy Lights drivers
People from Far Hills, New Jersey
Racing drivers from New Jersey
World of Outlaws drivers
Sportspeople from Somerset County, New Jersey